Fessenden is a surname. Notable people with the surname include:
 Anna Parker Fessenden (1896–1972), American botanist, math educator
 Beverly Fessenden (1926-2008), known as the actress Beverly Garland
 Francis Fessenden (1839–1907), American Civil War major general, lawyer and politician, son of William P. Fessenden
 James Deering Fessenden (1833–1882), American Civil War brigadier general, son of William P. Fessenden
 John Milton Fessenden (1804–1883), West Point graduate (Class of 1824), topography engineer and railroad engineer.
 Larry Fessenden (born 1963), American film director
 Laura Dayton Fessenden (1852-1924), American author 
 Nicholas Fessenden (1847–1927), Secretary of State for Maine (father of Stirling Fessenden)
 Reginald Fessenden (1866–1932), Canadian radio pioneer
 Richard Fessenden, chemistry professor, University of Notre Dame
 Samuel Fessenden (1784–1869), American abolitionist; father of Samuel Clement Fessenden, T. A. D. Fessenden, and William P. Fessenden
 Samuel Fessenden (lawyer) (1847–1908), lawyer and politician
 Samuel C. Fessenden (1815–1882), judge and U.S. Representative from Maine (1861–63)
 Stirling Fessenden (1875–1944), American lawyer, chairman of the Shanghai Municipal Council (1923–29)
 Susan Fessenden (1840–1932), American activist, reformer 
 T. A. D. Fessenden (1826–1868), attorney, and briefly U.S. Representative from Maine
 Thomas Green Fessenden (1771–1837), American author and editor
 William P. Fessenden (1806–1869), U.S. senator and Lincoln's Treasury Secretary